Below is a list of squads used in the 1988 Arab Cup.

Group A

Egypt
Coach:  Mike Smith

|}

Iraq
Coach: Ammo Baba

|}

Lebanon
Coach: Zein Hashem and Mahmoud Berjawi

|}

Saudi Arabia Ol.

Coach: 

|}

Tunisia

Coach: Taoufik Ben Othman

|}

Group B

Algeria UT 
Coach: Noureddine Saâdi and Abdelmalek Arraoui

|}

Bahrain

Jordan
Coach:  Slobodan Ogsananovic

|}

Kuwait Ol.

Coach:  Miguel Ferreira

|}

Syria
Coach:  Anatoliy Azarenkov

|}

External links
 1988 Arab Cup - rsssf.com

Squad
1988